Harald Gill Johnsen (19 March 1970 – 24 July 2011) was a Norwegian jazz double bassist, known for his contributions in bands like Køhn/Johansen Sextet and Tord Gustavsen Trio, and a series of recordings with such as Sonny Simmons, Sigurd Køhn, Nils-Olav Johansen, Jan Erik Kongshaug, Frode Barth, Per Oddvar Johansen and Ditlef Eckhoff.

Career 

Johnsen was a graduate of the Jazz program at Trondheim Musikkonservatorium (NTNU, 1989–92). He participated in the "two basses event" with the Trygve Seim led Trondheim Art Orchestra later called Trygve Seim Ensemble. He played a key role in a variety of jazz bands, including Nils-Olav Johansen Trio, Christian Belt Trio, Svein Olav Herstad Trio, Jan Erik Kongshaug Quartet and Køhn/Johansen Sextet. He was a member of several bands, including Erlend Skomsvoll's "Hvorfor Ikke?" in 1994, Erik Wesseltoft Quartet from 1995, "Appaloosa Nova" from 1996, and collaborated on the album You'll always need friends (1997) within The Alf Kjellman Project, and Choice (1998) with Monica Borgen. He has also played a while with Ditlef Eckhoff, releasing an album Impressions of Antibes (1997). In the last years of his life he had great success in the Tord Gustavsen Trio.

Johnsen has participated on several recordings, such as with Ditlef Eckhoff and Eric Reed on the album Impressions of Antibes (1997), and on the Einar Iversen led album Merry Christmas (1999) by Ditlef Eckhoff. Around the turn of the millennium, he joined Silje Nergaard Band and Tord Gustavsen Trio, which led to international releases. In addition he has played on recordings with, among others Karl Sundby (2004).

Johnsen also played with guitarist and composer Frode Barth since 1984. Their trio TAPE (guitar, bass and drums) along with drummer Tom Erling Lie, won the Youth Festival, Norwegian final, in 1988. They also released the album, Blue Spheres (2007).

Johnsen got an illness that prevented him gradually from playing actively. He died on 24 July 2011 at the age of 41.

Discography (in selection) 

With Tord Gustavsen Trio
2002: Changing Places (ECM)
2004: The Ground (ECM)
2006: Being There (ECM)

With Svein Olav Herstad Trio
1993 Dig (Ponca Jazz Recordings), trio including Torbjørn Engan
1997 Sommerregn (Ponca Jazz Recordings), trio including Per Oddvar Johansen
2006 Suite for Simmons (Jazzaway), trio including Johnsen/Johansen feat. Sonny Simmons live from Festiviteten Hall, Sildajazz in Haugesund (2005), performing a commission in six parts
With Silje Nergaard Band
2000 Port of call (EmArcy)
2001 At first light (EmArcy)
2003 Nightwatch (EmArcy)

With Ditlef Eckhoff
1997 Impressions of Antibes (Gemini Records)

With The Alf Kjellman Project
1997: You'll Always Need Friends (Gemini Records)

With Monica Borgen
1998: Choice (Midnight Blue Music)

With Jan Erik Kongshaug
1998: The Other World (ACT)
2003: All These Years (Hot Club Records)

Within "Køhn/Johansen Sextet»
1999: Woman's Got to Have It
2003: Angels

With Einar Iversen & Ditlef Eckhoff
1999: Merry Christmas (Hi-Di Music)

With Erik Wesseltoft Quintet
2004: Con Amor (Normann Records)

With Trond Bjertnes & Frode Barth
1993 Egentlig (Ponca Jazz Records)
1997 JEG (MTG)
Duo with Frode Barth
2007: Blue spheres (MTG)

With other projects
1988: Hummer og kanari, Frode A. Danielsen
1996: Østkantblues, Karl Sundby / Erik Wesseltoft
1999: Together, Inge Stangvik / Eivind Sannes

References

External links 

 Biography: Johnsen, Harald – Norsk musikkinformasjon Ballade.no
 Biografi Harald Johnsen in Store norske leksikon

1970 births
2011 deaths
Norwegian jazz upright-bassists
Male double-bassists
Jazz double-bassists
Norwegian University of Science and Technology alumni
Musicians from Kristiansand
ECM Records artists
Male jazz musicians
Tord Gustavsen Ensemble members